Esfian or Esfiyan or Esfeyan may refer to:
 Esfian, Fars
 Esfian, South Khorasan